La Naissance D'Un Rêve is the second album by the German band Lacrimas Profundere. It was released through Witchhunt records and recorded at Zinnkopf Audio in Siegsdorf, Germany. The title is French for 'The Birth of a Dream.'

The album was re-released three times: In 2002 in Korea containing two bonus tracks "The Meadows of Light" and "Eternal Sleep (Orchestral Version)" produced by Sail Productions. Also, in the same year, it was re-released as a part of "The Fallen Years" double CD album, produced by "Scarecrow Records (Mexico)". And lastly in 2003 in Russia with one bonus track.

Track listing

Personnel
Christopher Schmid: Vocals 
Anja Hötzendorfer: Violin and Female Vocals
Oliver Nikolas Schmid: Guitars
Markus Lapper: Bass
Stefan Eireiner: Drums
Christian Steiner: Keyboards
Eva Stöger: Flute

External links
 
 
 

Lacrimas Profundere albums
1997 albums